Bibenzyl is the organic compound with the formula (C6H5CH2)2. It can be viewed as a derivative of ethane in which one phenyl group is bonded to each carbon atom.  It is a colorless solid.

Occurrences 
The compound is the product from the coupling of a pair of benzyl radicals.

Bibenzyl forms the central core of some natural products like dihydrostilbenoids and isoquinoline alkaloids.  Marchantins are a family of bis(bibenzyl)-containing macrocycles.

See also 
 Benzil
 Benzoin

References 

Hydrocarbons
Benzyl compounds